The 1932 LSU Tigers football team represented Louisiana State University (LSU) in the 1932 Southern Conference football season.  This was LSU's final season as a member of the Southern Conference, and it won a share of the conference title. After the first two games, all the rest were shutouts either by LSU or the opponent.

Before the season
After attempting to hire Robert Neyland, another Army alum, Biff Jones, succeeded coach Russ Cohen.

Schedule

Season summary

TCU
The season opened with a 3–3 tie against Johnny Vaught and Southwest Conference champion TCU.

Rice
Beginning a series that ran until 1952, LSU faced Rice. Huey Long led a 150-cadet formation through the streets of Houston. A field goal decided the game, and LSU was defeated 10–8.

Spring Hill

LSU swamped Spring Hill 80–0. The starting lineup was Fleming (left end), J. Skidmore (left tackle), Wilson (left guard), Stovall (center), Mitchell (right guard), Torrance (right tackle), Moore (right end), Lobdell (quarterback), Keller (left halfback), Sullivan (right halfback), and Yates (fullback).

Mississippi A&M
LSU then proceeded to win five straight shut-out victories. In Monroe, LSU defeated Mississippi A&M 24–0.

Arkansas
In Shreveport, against Arkansas, LSU won 14–0.

Sewanee
At homecoming, rival Sewanee was beat 38–0.

South Carolina
In Columbia, LSU defeated South Carolina 6–0.

Centenary

Despite being undefeated, Centenary upset LSU when it won 6–0. Paul Geisler played for Centenary. It has been said it was Centenary's greatest football win in the school's history.

Tulane
LSU beat rival and defending SoCon champion Tulane 14–0. Don Zimmerman and others were sidelined by a flu epidemic.

Oregon
Against Oregon, LSU was upset 12–0.

Postseason
LSU subsequently joined the Southeastern Conference.

References

LSU
LSU Tigers football seasons
LSU Tigers football